Balkan Express is a 1983 Yugoslavian film by director Branko Baletić.

Cast 
Dragan Nikolić as Popaj
Bora Todorović as Pik
Tanja Bošković as Lili
Bata Živojinović as Stojčić
Olivera Marković as Aunt
Radko Polič as Captain Dietrich
Toma Zdravković as the singer
Branko Cvejić as Kostica
Bogdan Diklić as Ernest
Ratko Tankosić as the waiter
Predrag Miletić as Gerd
Milan Erak as Maksim 
Gojko Baletić as Boško
Hajdana Baletić as Lea
Milo Miranović as Agent
Bata Kameni as German soldier

See also 
List of Yugoslavian films

References

External links

1983 films
Yugoslav war comedy films
1980s Serbian-language films
Serbian war comedy films
Films set in Serbia
Films set in Yugoslavia
Films set in Belgrade
Films shot in Belgrade
War films set in Partisan Yugoslavia
1980s war comedy films
Yugoslav World War II films
Serbian World War II films